People's organization is a generic term for organizations in the People's Republic of China excluding governments, the official departments of government, and enterprises or institutions, yet are recognized to be a part of Chinese Communist Party's united front.

List of people's organizations

See also
Chinese People's Political Consultative Conference
Corporatism

References

Chinese People's Political Consultative Conference
Organizations associated with the Chinese Communist Party
United front (China)